Discovery Channel Romania was a television channel in Romania.

The dedicated channel for Romania was launched in 2006. At the same time Discovery Networks Europe opened a local office in Bucharest. Before this, Romania had received a pan-regional feed of the Discovery Channel.

The channel adopted the new Discovery logo on July 1, 2009 along with its sister channels in Central Europe.

 Deadliest Catch
 Dr. G: Medical Examiner
 How It's Made
 Man vs. Wild
 One Way Out
 American Chopper
 MythBusters

Discovery Networks also broadcasts to Romania the Pan-Regional channels Animal Planet, Discovery Science, Investigation Discovery and Discovery HD. It was closed in Winter 2018.

References

External links
 Discovery investeste in brand si vrea mai multi bani din publicitate
 Katarzyna Kieli, general manager Discovery Networks Central Europe: Piata de cablu si satelit s-a dezvoltat in ciuda crizei
 Discovery Channel investeste intr-o grila localizata pentru Romania

Defunct television channels in Romania
Romania
Television channels and stations established in 2006
Television channels and stations disestablished in 2018
2006 establishments in Romania
2018 disestablishments in Romania